The Jamtoil–Joydebpur Line  is a dual gauge railway line connecting Joydebpur and Jamtoil, Sirajganj District in Bangladesh. This track is under the jurisdiction of Bangladesh Railway.

Jamalpur–Bangabandhu Bridge East section

References

Dual gauge railways in Bangladesh